is a Japanese visual kei band formed in 2010. Currently they are on the label B.P Records, their line-up includes Hayato on vocals, Yume on guitar, meN-meN as bassist and Chamu on drums.

Career 
The band was formed in Tokyo in April 2010 and started performing in November, with Hayato on vocals, Yume and Kana on guitars, meN-meN as bassist and Chamu on drums.

In collaboration with the bands Kiryu and Royz they released the single "Family Party" on November 25, 2015.

On January 3, 2018, guitarist Kana was reported missing. Two days later, the band received a letter from Kana apologizing and wishing to leave the band.

On March 13, 2019, they released the album "Tegura Magura" in two editions, which peaked at the 27° position on Oricon charts.

Members

Current 
 Hayato   (ハヤト) - vocal

All song lyrics are written by Hayato.

 Yume (ゆめ) - guitar
 meN-meN - bass
 Chamu (チャム) - drums

Former members 
 Kana (華那) - guitar

Discography

Studio albums

References 

Musical quartets
Visual kei musical groups
Japanese rock music groups
Musical groups established in 2010
2010 establishments in Japan